Georg Hettich (born 12 October 1978 in Furtwangen im Schwarzwald, Baden-Württemberg) is a Nordic combined skier and Olympic medalist from Germany.

Hettich was a surprise winner of the 15 km individual event at the 2006 Winter Olympics. At the 2002 Winter Olympics, he won a silver medal in the 4 x 5 km team event and repeated this in 2006. With his bronze in the 7.5 km sprint contest in 2006, he completed his medal collection.

Hettich also won silver medals at the FIS Nordic World Ski Championships in the 4 x 5 km team event both in 2003 and 2005.

References
 
  

1978 births
Living people
People from Furtwangen im Schwarzwald
Sportspeople from Freiburg (region)
German male Nordic combined skiers
Nordic combined skiers at the 2002 Winter Olympics
Nordic combined skiers at the 2006 Winter Olympics
Nordic combined skiers at the 2010 Winter Olympics
Olympic gold medalists for Germany
Olympic silver medalists for Germany
Olympic bronze medalists for Germany
Olympic Nordic combined skiers of Germany
Olympic medalists in Nordic combined
FIS Nordic World Ski Championships medalists in Nordic combined
Medalists at the 2006 Winter Olympics
Medalists at the 2002 Winter Olympics
Universiade medalists in nordic combined
Universiade gold medalists for Germany
Competitors at the 2005 Winter Universiade